Antoine de Saporta (26 July 1855 – 14 April 1914) was a French aristocrat and non-fiction writer.

Biography

Early life
Antoine de Saporta was born on July 26, 1855, in Aix-en-Provence. He was a member of the Provençal nobility. His father, Gaston de Saporta (1823-1895), was a renowned botanist. He grew up in the Hôtel Boyer de Fonscolombe, a listed hôtel particulier at 21 Rue Gaston de Saporta in Aix-en-Provence.

Career
He wrote several books, mostly about wine. He also wrote many articles for La Nature, La Revue scientifique and Revue des deux Mondes.

Death
He died on April 14, 1914, in Montpellier.

Bibliography
Aurores boréales (1885).
La Chimie des vins : les vins naturels, les vins manipulés et falsifiés (1889).
Les Théories et les notations de la chimie moderne (1889).
Le Congrès viticole de Montpellier (1893).
La Vigne et le vin dans le midi de la France (1894).
Physique et chimie viticoles (1899).
Traité de viticulture théorie et pratique (1899).
Les corps simples de la chimie.
Les Artifices de toilette, les fards. Cheveux teints et postiches. Les artifices de toilette sur la scène.

References

Provencal nobility
1855 births
1914 deaths
People from Aix-en-Provence
French male non-fiction writers
French science writers
Wine chemistry